Vae victis is Latin for "woe to the vanquished", or "woe to the conquered". It means that those defeated in battle are entirely at the mercy of their conquerors and should not expect—or request—leniency.

According to tradition, in 390 BC, an army of Gauls led by Brennus attacked Rome, capturing all of the city except for the Capitoline Hill. Brennus besieged the hill, and finally the Romans asked to ransom their city. Brennus demanded 1,000 pounds (329 kg) of gold, and the Romans agreed to his terms. According to Plutarch's life of Camillus and Livy's Ab Urbe Condita (Book 5 Sections 34–49), the Gauls provided steelyard balances and weights, which were used to measure the amount of gold. The Romans brought the gold, but claimed that the provided weights were rigged in the Gauls' favor. The Romans complained to Brennus, who took his sword, threw it onto the weights, and exclaimed, "Vae victis!" The Romans thus needed to bring even more gold, as they now had to counterbalance the sword as well. Livy and Plutarch claim that Camillus subsequently succeeded in defeating the Gauls before the ransom had to be paid, although Polybius, Diodorus Siculus, and a later passage from Livy contradict this.

Most of the events related by ancient historians about early Roman history are considered legends, while the Gaulish sack of Rome is one of the first events which modern scholars are confident actually occurred, although the colourful incidents reported by tradition are not accepted.

See also

 Battle of the Allia
 Jungle law
 List of Latin phrases
 Might makes right
 Right of conquest
 Trial by battle
 Victor's justice

References

390 BC
Latin words and phrases
Quotations from military
Latin legal terminology
Justice
4th century BC in the Roman Republic